Khojki is a Unicode block containing characters used by the Khoja community of South Asia.

History
The following Unicode-related documents record the purpose and process of defining specific characters in the Khojki block:

References 

Unicode blocks